Antonio Correr may refer to:

Antonio Correr (bishop) (1378–1445), Italian Roman Catholic bishop
Antonio Correr (cardinal) (1359–1445), Italian Roman Catholic cardinal